Hannu-Pekka Parviainen (born 18 August 1981), nicknamed HP, is a Finnish snowboarder, stunt performer, and member of the stunt group the Dudesons.

According to an official fan page, Parviainen is no longer qualified for health insurance from any companies in Finland.

Filmography

TV

Films

References

External links

Living people
1981 births
People from Seinäjoki
Finnish male actors
Finnish male snowboarders
Finnish stunt performers